was a Nippon Professional Baseball pitcher.

1921 births
2005 deaths
Baseball people from Aichi Prefecture
Shochiku Robins players
Chunichi Dragons players
Japanese baseball players
Nippon Professional Baseball pitchers
Japanese baseball coaches
Nippon Professional Baseball coaches